is a city located in Saitama Prefecture, Japan. , the city had an estimated population of 140,902 in 66,765 households and a population density of 7700 persons per km².

Geography
Toda is located in the flat lowlands of  far southeastern Saitama Prefecture, separated from Tokyo by the Arakawa River. The Sasame River also flows through the city before joining the Arakawa.

Surrounding municipalities
 Saitama Prefecture
 Saitama
 Asaka
 Kawaguchi
 Wakō
 Warabi
 Tokyo Metropolis
 Itabashi
 Kita

Climate
Toda has a humid subtropical climate (Köppen Cfa) characterized by warm summers and cool winters with light to no snowfall.  The average annual temperature in Toda is 14.8 °C. The average annual rainfall is 1482 mm with September as the wettest month. The temperatures are highest on average in August, at around 26.6 °C, and lowest in January, at around 3.2 °C.

Demographics
Per Japanese census data, the population of Toda has increased rapidly from the 1960s to the present day.

History
The villages of Niizo, Kamitoda and Shimotoda were created within Kitaadachi District, Saitama with the establishment of the modern municipalities system on April 1, 1889. The villages merged on June 1, 1941 to form the town of Toda. The town annexed the village of Misasa on July 20, 1957. The rowing competition of the 1964 Tokyo Olympics took place in Toda near to where the present day Toda-Koen Station is located. The rowing area which is adjacent to the Arakawa River is still in use today. Toda was elevated to city status on October 1, 1966.

Government
Toda has a mayor-council form of government with a directly elected mayor and a unicameral city council of 26 members. Toda contributes two members to the Saitama Prefectural Assembly. In terms of national politics, the city is part of Saitama 15th district of the lower house of the Diet of Japan.

Economy
Much of the residential and commercial development in Toda is due to its proximity to the city of Tokyo and the efficient commuter rail links available. This has enabled Toda to act as a bedroom community of Tokyo and is thus an apt location of residence for those who wish to work in the Tokyo Metropolis. There has been a continuous increase in population since the construction of the three Saikyo Line stations in the 1980s and this has had a positive effect on the economy and development of the city.

There are a significant number of transportation/logistics and printing-based enterprises in Toda. Large companies that have their headquarters in Toda-shi include Okazen Transportation (Haulage/Logistics), Khobho (IT services), Chiyoda (Food Manufacturing). Other large companies that have significant operations in Toda are Yamato Transportation, Meiji Dairy, Jomo, Mainichi Newspaper, Chunichi Newspaper, Mitsubishi Tanabe Pharma, Sanyo Electric, Japan Restaurant Enterprise, and Hayakawa Publishing.

Education
Toda has 12 public elementary schools and six public middle schools operated by the city government, and two public high schools operated by the Saitama Prefectural Board of Education.

Transportation

Railway
An arrangement of the Toda City song has been used as the departure melody for trains departing from the up platform (platform 1) of the three Saikyo Line stations in Toda since 1 August 2007.

 JR East – Saikyo Line
 -   -

Highway
 
  Shuto Expressway  Ikebukuro Route 
  Shuto Expressway  Ōmiya Route

Bus services
There are various bus services in the city. Most of the routes are run by Kokusai Kogyo bus company. In addition there is a distinctive low cost mini-bus service known as Toco. This stands for Toda Community bus. The Toco service serves routes within the city limits unlike the regular Kokusai Kogyo bus routes which usually bring commuters to and from train stations on the Saikyo and Keihin-Tohoku train lines.

Sister city relations
  Liverpool, New South Wales, Australia, since October 1, 1992
  Kaifeng, Henan, China, friendship city since August 21, 1984

Local attractions
Toda Rowing Course

Noted people from Toda
Tomoya Ugajin, professional association football/soccer player
Yui Hasegawa, professional association football/soccer player
Natsuna Watanabe, actress
Kotono Mitsuishi, Voice Actress

References

External links

Official Website 

Cities in Saitama Prefecture
Toda, Saitama